Zaviyeh-ye Sofla (also Romanized as Zāvīyeh-ye Soflá and Zaviyeh Sofla; also known as Zāveyeh, Zāvīeh, Zāvīyeh, and Zāvīyeh-ye Pā’īn) is a village in Chaldoran-e Shomali Rural District, in the Central District of Chaldoran County, West Azerbaijan Province, Iran. At the 2006 census, its population was 401, in 99 families.

References 

Populated places in Chaldoran County